Vanai (also Romanized as Vanā’ī, Vennā’ī, and Vannā’ī) is a village in Gudarzi Rural District, Oshtorinan District, Borujerd County, Lorestan Province, Iran. At the 2006 census, its population was 4,649, in 1,205 families.

References 

Towns and villages in Borujerd County